The initially called Morris Liebmann Memorial Prize provided by the Institute of Radio Engineers (IRE), the IEEE Morris N. Liebmann Memorial Award was created in 1919 in honor of Colonel Morris N. Liebmann. It was initially given to awardees who had "made public during the recent past an important contribution to radio communications". The award continued to be awarded as the IEEE Morris N. Liebmann Memorial Award by the board of directors of the Institute of Electrical and Electronics Engineers (IEEE) after the IRE organization merged into the IEEE in 1963. The scope was changed to "for important contributions to emerging technologies recognized within recent years". After 2000, the award was superseded by the IEEE Daniel E. Noble Award.

Recipients 
The following people received the IEEE Morris N. Liebmann Memorial Award:

 2000 – James S. Harris, Jr.
 1998 – Naoki Yokoyama
 1997 – Fujio Masuoka
 1996 – Seiki Ogura
 1995 – M. George Craford
 1994 – Lubomyr T. Romankiw
 1993 – B. Jayant Baliga
 1992 – Praveen Chaudhari, Jerome J. Cuomo, and Richard J. Gambino
 1991 – Morton B. Panish
 1990 – Satoshi Hiyamizu and Takashi Mimura
 1989 – Takanori Okoshi
 1988 – James R. Boddie and Richard A. Pedersen
 1986 – Bishnu S. Atal and Fumitada Itakura
 1985 – Russell D. Dupuis and Harold M. Manasevit
 1984 – David E. Carlson and Christopher R. Wronski
 1983 – Robert W. Brodersen, Paul R. Gray, and David A. Hodges
 1982 – John Arthur, Jr. and Alfred Y. Cho
 1981 – Calvin F. Quate
 1980 – Anthony J. Demaria
 1979 – Ping King Tien
 1978 – Charles K. Kao, John B. MacChesney, and Robert D. Maurer
 1977 – Horst H. Berger and Siegfried K. Wiedmann
 1976 – Herbert John Shaw
 1975 – A. H. Bobeck, P. C. Michaelis, and H. E. D. Scovil
 1974 – Willard Boyle and George E. Smith
 1973 – Nick Holonyak
 1972 – Stewart E. Miller
 1971 – Martin Ryle
 1970 – John A. Copeland
 1969 – J. B. Gunn
 1968 – Emmett N. Leith
 1966 – Paul K. Weimer
 1965 – William R. Bennett, Jr.
 1964 – Arthur L. Schawlow

The following people received the IRE Morris Liebmann Memorial Prize:

 1963 – Ian Munro Ross
 1962 – Victor H. Rumsey
 1961 – Leo Esaki
 1960 – Jan A. Rajchman
 1959 – Nicolaas Bloembergen and Charles H. Townes
 1958 – E. L. Ginzton
 1957 – O. G. Villard, Jr.
 1956 – Kenneth Bullington
 1955 – A. V. Loughren
 1954 – R. R. Warnecke
 1953 – John Alvin Pierce
 1952 – William Shockley
 1951 – R. B. Dome
 1950 – O. H. Schade
 1949 – C. E. Shannon
 1948 – S. W. Seeley
 1947 – John Robinson Pierce
 1946 – Albert Rose
 1945 – P. C. Goldmark
 1944 – W. W. Hansen
 1943 – Wilmer L. Barrow
 1942 – S. A. Schelkunoff
 1941 – Philo T. Farnsworth
 1940 – Harold Alden Wheeler
 1939 – H. T. Friis
 1938 – G. C. Southworth
 1937 – W. H. Doherty
 1936 – B. J. Thompson
 1935 – F. B. Llewellyn
 1934 – Vladimir Zworykin
 1933 – Heinrich Barkhausen
 1932 – Edmond Bruce
 1931 – Stuart Ballantine
 1930 – Albert Hull
 1929 – E. V. Appleton
 1928 – W. G. Cady
 1927 – A. H. Taylor
 1926 – Ralph Bown
 1925 – Frank Conrad
 1924 – J. R. Carson
 1923 – Harold Beverage
 1922 – C. S. Franklin
 1921 – R. A. Heising
 1920 – R. A. Weagant
 1919 – L. F. Fuller

References 

Morris N. Liebmann Memorial Award
Awards established in 1919
1919 establishments in the United States